The Lost Recipe is a 2021 Philippine television drama romantic fantasy series broadcast by GMA News TV and GTV. Directed by Monti Puno Parungao, it stars Kelvin Miranda and Mikee Quintos. It premiered on January 18, 2021, on the network's evening line up. The series concluded on March 31, 2021, with a total of 52 episodes.

This series is streaming online on YouTube.

Premise
Harvey Napoleon is a chef who is inspired by Conchita Valencia, the "Mother of Philippine Cuisine." Known for his Philippine adobo, for which he claimed is better than Conchita. When a renowned food critic visits his restaurant and gives it a one-star rating, he and his restaurant quickly loses patrons.

While running away after not paying his bill on a bar, he finds himself at the Philippine Food Museum. He encounters a magical being who gives him an access to travel in time. He time travels to the Spanish-era Philippines, where he meets Conchita and manages to grab a page of her adobo recipe. This will lead to a modified present where Conchita Valencia is not known. Knowing that there is no other way to restore the past, he vows to recreate the lost recipe.

Cast and characters

Lead cast
 Kelvin Miranda as Harvey Napoleon / Marcelo
 Mikee Quintos as Apple Valencia / Consuelo Valencia

Supporting cast
 Paul Salas as Franklin "Frank" Vergara
 Thea Tolentino as Ginger Valeria Romano
 Phytos Ramirez as Tom Miranda
 Crystal Paras as Nori Buenaventura
 Faye Lorenzo as Pepper Soriano
 Anton Amoncio as Filbert dela Cruz
 Prince Clemente as Kobe Medina
 Kim Rodriguez / Arra San Agustin / Yesha Burce as Dulce
 Topper Fabregas as Alfredo "Fredo" Legaspi
 Ariella Arida as Lotus Mandela / Elora
 Almira Muhlach as Hazel Valeria-Romano
 Maureen Larrazabal as Cherry Valencia
 Lucho Ayala as Benedict Napoleon
 Sue Prado as Honey Napoleon
 Lui Manansala as Sugar Valencia
 Arny Ross as Bree
 Jose Sarasola as Maki
 Nikki Co as Bran

Guest cast
 Allan Paule as Ruben Napoleon
 Manilyn Reynes as Conchita Valencia
 Gabby Eigenmann as Waldorf
 Addy Raj as Aldrin
 Rowena Concepcion as Manager Oreo
 Alexandra Abdon as Peachy
 Yvette Sanchez as Candy
 Pepita Curtis as Angelica
 Ruru Madrid as Jordan Buenavidez
 Shaira Diaz as Julienne Buenavidez
 Luis Hontiveros as Coco
 Franchesca Salcedo as Reese
 Michael Flores as Ceasar Romano
 Divina Valencia as Rosemary
 Brent Valdez as Rey
 Tina Paner as Cayenne
 Althea Ablan as Ham
 Ahron Villena as Father Time (Past, Present and Future)
 Will Ashley as Tarragon
 Arvic Tan as Caper / Black Cat
 Akihiro Ishii as Crisanto
 Coleen Paz as Jasmine Magbanua
 Claire Castro as Kisses
 Enrico Cuenca as Cajun
 Melissa Mendez as President Almonte

Accolades

References

External links
 
 

2021 Philippine television series debuts
2021 Philippine television series endings
Filipino-language television shows
GMA Integrated News and Public Affairs shows
GMA News TV original programming
GTV (Philippine TV network) original programming
Television shows set in the Philippines